The 1909 Benavente earthquake occurred on April 23 at 17:39:36 local  in the Santarém District of the Central Region, Portugal. The earthquake had an estimated moment magnitude of 6.0 and a maximum intensity assigned at X (Extreme) on the Mercalli scale. It nearly destroyed the town of Benavente, killing 60 and injuring 75 people as a result.

Earthquake
Reassessment of the earthquake magnitude suggest a magnitude of 6.0 on the moment magnitude scale. The reassessed magnitude is significantly smaller than the previous value of 6.6. The most consistent focal mechanism solution is reverse faulting along a northeast–southwest striking fault plane at an estimated depth of focus of 10 km. The location suggest it occurred in a seismic zone in the Lower Tagus Valley.

There are no documented surface ruptures associated with the earthquake. It is thought that the earthquake rupture along the seismogenic structure near the surface were distributed along branch faults or dips at very shallow angles. If surface ruptures were to occur, it is likely they were destroyed due to flooding in the valley. Surface fissures and sand volcanoes were observed in the ground.

Impact
The earthquake produced extreme shaking, peaking at X (Extreme) near the epicenter, over an area of 450 km2. Liquefaction occurred in the Tagus and Sorraia river plains. At Lisbon, 30 km away, the quake was felt VI (Strong). Intensity VI was also felt in the cities of Setúbal and Évora, causing some damage. Moderate shaking (V) was felt in Spain. 

Despite being known as the Benavente earthquake, named after the town, it was in the towns of Samora Correia and Muge were the heaviest damage occurred. Nearly 90% of the towns were destroyed. In Benavente, the foundation of a building detached from its structure and tumbled into the Tagus river. Two churches were severely damaged and unsafe for use. A seminary sustained damage when plasters fell from the front facade.

See also 
List of earthquakes in 1909
List of earthquakes in Portugal

References

Further reading
 

Earthquakes in Portugal
1909 earthquakes
1909 in Portugal
Centro Region, Portugal
Santarém District
April 1909 events
1900s in Lisbon